Cubanana is a monotypic genus of  tarantulas containing the single species, Cubanana cristinae. It was first described by D. Ortiz in 2008, and is endemic to Cuba, occurring in the east of the island.

See also
 List of Theraphosidae species

References

Monotypic Theraphosidae genera
Spiders of the Caribbean
Theraphosidae
Endemic fauna of Cuba